Kwai Fong is an elevated railway station on  of Hong Kong's MTR system.

Named after Kwai Fong Estate, a large public housing estate to its northeast, Kwai Fong, the neighbourhood around the station, has become a transit interchange, business centre, as well as the landmark area of Kwai Chung. Since opening, all sorts of road transportation from various places in the Kwai Tsing District have converged here. A shopping centre (Metroplaza) was also built west of the station in the early 1990s. The station also serves those who work in the factories to its east.

The tracks north of the station are surrounded by concrete noise barriers to minimise noise pollution for residents living near the railway.

History
Kwai Fong station was built as part of the Tsuen Wan Extension project, the first extension of the MTR system following its 1979 opening. The new line served to link the Tsuen Wan New Town to Kowloon. It opened on 10 May 1982.

Automatic platform gates were installed at this station in August 2011.

Station layout

 The tracks of platform 1 and 2 are located next to each other in the middle of the station. Passengers have to ride different escalators up as according to the platform they want to go to.

Kwai Fong station is one of the three elevated stations of the Tsuen Wan line.

The structure of Kwai Fong station is very similar to Kwai Hing station.

Passengers can go to Exit E from Platform 1 without going down any escalators, but for Platform 2, passengers should take an escalator down to the concourse, and take an escalator back to Platform 1, and go to Exit E. From Exit E to the platform, it is the same as the above.

Entrances/Exits
A: New Kwai Fong Gardens D-E, Kwai Fong Estate
B: New Kwai Fong Gardens A-C
C: Kwai Tsing Theatre 
D: Kwai Chung Plaza, Metroplaza (ground level) 
E: Metroplaza (via footbridge linking Platform 1)

Exits A through D are located at the ground floor of the station, while Exit E is located on Platform 1 (towards Tsuen Wan).

References

MTR stations in the New Territories
Tsuen Wan line
Railway stations in Hong Kong opened in 1982
1982 establishments in Hong Kong